i-Lived is a 2015 American horror thriller film written and directed by Franck Khalfoun.

Plot
A young online app reviewer's latest assignment mysteriously improves his life but also starts to tear him apart, bringing his existence into a downward spiral.

Cast
 Jan Broberg as Josh's Mom
 Franck Khalfoun as Detective McQuee (voice)
 Josh Cowdery as Executive #2
 Shannon Collis as Drunk Girl
 Luis Fernandez-Gil as Roberto Luis
 Jeremiah Watkins as Josh
 Thomas Payton as Zach
 Koral Michaels as Kidnapped Girl
 Nic D'Avirro as Josh's Dad

Production
Filming took place in Los Angeles, California in May 2014.

References

External links
 

2015 films
2015 horror thriller films
American horror thriller films
2010s mystery thriller films
2015 horror films
American mystery thriller films
Films directed by Franck Khalfoun
Films shot in Los Angeles
Films about the Internet
2010s English-language films
2010s American films